Mirza Jalal-ud-din Miran Shah Beg (1366 – 20 April 1408), commonly known as Miran Shah, was a son of the Central Asian conqueror Timur, founder of the Timurid Empire. 

During his father's reign, Miran Shah was initially a powerful regional governor and prominent military commander, having aided Timur in his conquests as well as suppressing several revolts. However, after facing accusations of destructive and hedonistic behaviour, the prince was later deposed from these roles by the emperor. Following Timur's death in 1405, Miran Shah became embroiled in the ensuing war of succession, having thrown his support behind his son Khalil Sultan. He was later killed whilst battling against the Timurid's traditional rivals, the Qara Qoyunlu.

Though never ruling in his own right, the line of Miran Shah played a prominent role in the history of the Timurid Empire. His grandson Abu Sa'id Mirza eventually came to rule the majority of Transoxiana in the latter half of the 15th century. Abu Sa'id's own grandson was Babur, the founder of the Mughal Empire of India.

Early life
Miran Shah was born in 1366, the third of Timur's four sons. His mother was a concubine, Mengli Khatun, daughter of Hayut of the Jauni Qurban tribe.

In 1380, prior to his conquest of Khorasan, Timur pre-emptively named Miran Shah (at this point fourteen years old) governor of the region. The kingdom was then under the rule of the Kartid dynasty, who quickly submitted to Timur's army. In 1383, the head of the former royal family, Ghiyas-uddin Pir 'Ali, became complicit in a plot against Timur. Miran Shah quickly crushed the rebellion and annexed the Kartid capital of Herat, which he made his viceregal seat. Several years later, the last of the Kartids, Ghiyas-uddin's son Pir Muhammad, was killed by Miran Shah in a banquet that the latter hosted. Chroniclers Abd al-Razzaq Samarqandi and Sharaf al-Din Ali Yazdi (writing in the Matla al-sa'dayn and Zafarnama respectively) record Miran Shah as having laughed whilst decapitating the prince; they note that he later explained his actions as being due to excessive drinking.

Military career
In the winter of 1386, Timur launched an invasion of Azerbaijan, an area that had by that point been sought after by the Golden Horde for over a century. Tokhtamysh, the Khan of the Golden Horde and Timur's erstwhile ally, sent his army against the invading force and defeated their advance-guard, resulting in the loss of forty of Timur's officers. Miran Shah was commanded to avenge this defeat and routed the enemy force, pursuing the fleeing soldiers as far as Derbent, the frontier of the Golden Horde. Some of Tokhtamysh's most distinguished followers were taken captive, who were then escorted by Miran Shah to his father's winter quarters in Karabakh, where they were presented to Timur in chains. Contrary to his usual practise however, Timur treated the prisoners leniently and returned them to Tokhtamysh. They were sent bearing only paternal reproaches towards the Khan, a final, ultimately unsuccessful attempt by Timur to discourage his former mentee from further hostilities.

Several revolts were also put down by Miran Shah in subsequent years. In 1389 the governor of Tus, Amir Hajji Beg Jauni Qurbani, aided by a Sarbadar ruler, sought to make himself independent. Timur sent Miran Shah who, after a protracted siege of several months, had Tus sacked and razed, with the city suffering a heavy death toll.

In 1394, Timur entered a conflict with members of a Sufi sect known as the Hurufis. This was likely as a result of both heresy charges laid against the group by traditional religious scholars, as well as Timur's own attempts to remove potential threats to his rule from the area. Miran Shah was instructed to arrest the founder of the movement Fazlallah Astarabadi al-Hurufi who was, according to legend, executed by the prince himself. The death of their leader led al-Hurufi's followers to have a specific hatred against the Timurids. Miran Shah in particular was considered to be the Dajjal (Antichrist) and was further mocked as Maran Shah (King of Snakes).

Viceroy of Persia

By 1393, Timur had conquered all the lands that had formerly been part of the Mongol Ilkhanate. This dominion, which Timur termed "the throne of Hulagu", was bestowed upon Miran Shah. The prince's fief was now the entirety of northern Persia and Transcaucasia, and included the cities of Baghdad, Tabriz and Soltaniyeh.

However Miran Shah, who had been suffering from mental issues following a fall from his horse several years earlier, began to show increasingly destructive tendencies during his rule.  Ruy González de Clavijo, the Castilian ambassador to Timur's court, claimed that the prince had ancient buildings destroyed, supposedly so that it would be known that "Miran Shah did nothing himself, but he ordered the finest works in the world to be demolished". The biographer Dawlatshah reported that Miran Shah also ordered the tomb of the historian Rashid-al-Din Hamadani be dismantled and for his bones to be re-interred in a Jewish cemetery. This was said to be due to the latter's Semitic descent. There are doubts however regarding this claim, since Miran Shah was purported to have had an interest in Muslim historic literature.

Reports eventually started reaching Timur of his son's behaviour. Stories were heard in the imperial court of chaotic gambling, drinking bouts held within mosques and gold coins being scattered from palace windows to frenzied mobs. Miran Shah's excessive lifestyle evidently took its toll on his health, as he was described by Clavijo as "big and fat, and he suffers much from the gout."

In addition to this, Timur had concerns regarding unrest and taxation problems in Miran Shah's domains, as well as the prince's military failures. Chief among these was his inability to capture the fortress of Alinja from the Jalairid Sultanate in 1395. Here Prince Tahir, son of Sultan Ahmad Jalayir, had been besieged by Miran Shah before being relieved by George VI of Georgia, the combined forces of whom defeated the Timurid army.

Worries had also been raised for the emperor regarding his son's loyalty. Miran Shah had alluded in letters about his father's increasing age and doubts about Timur's continued capabilities of ruling. These suspicions were realised when Miran Shah's wife, the Khwarezmian princess Khanzada Begum, reached out to her father-in-law. Khanzada reported her husband's rebellious intentions as well as complaining about her mistreatment at his hands. Dawlatshah states that Timur was moved to tears when Khanzada presented to him her blood-stained chemise, though this episode was not confirmed in contemporary sources. Official histories only state that Miran Shah made crude accusations against her that were later disproved. Nevertheless, the angry Khanzada never returned to her husband and remained with Timur in Samarqand.

In 1399, Timur sent a detachment of troops under his nephew Sulaiman Shah to investigate his concerns. Miran Shah, without posing any difficulties, returned with them to face his father, who had by this point arrived in Soltaniyeh to confront him. Having tied a rope around his neck, Miran Shah appeared before the emperor and begged for his forgiveness. Timur was said to have been at the point of ordering his son's execution, only refraining due to the intercession of his relatives and nobles. Instead, Miran Shah was deposed from his lands and assigned to Timur's own retinue, where he would remain for the next four years. His friends and advisers, among whom were well known figures, were severely punished, with some being executed for the alleged crime of corrupting the prince and leading him astray.

War of succession and death

Timur had never unambiguously appointed an heir, so at the time of his death in February 1405, a succession dispute erupted among his surviving sons and grandsons. Miran Shah was Timur's eldest living son by this point, but was not considered an active contender to the throne and was passed over in favour of his own son, Khalil Sultan.

The latter proclaimed himself emperor at Tashkent soon after his grandfather's death and seized the royal treasury, as well as Timur's imperial capital Samarqand. Sultan Husayn Tayichiud, a maternal grandson of Timur as well as Miran Shah's son-in-law, also made a bid for the throne before aligning himself with Khalil Sultan. Shah Rukh, governor of Herat and Timur's other surviving son, made no offensive move against his nephews at this point. This was likely due to Miran Shah, who posed a serious threat as he, along with his other son Abu Bakr, had led an army out of Azerbaijan in support of Khalil Sultan.

However, Miran Shah and Abu Bakr were forced to withdraw prior to being able to do this. Ahmad Jalayir, who had been expelled by Timur fifteen years previously, took advantage of the old emperor's death to recapture his former lands. The two princes drove out Jalayir at Tabriz before being forced to contend with another former enemy: Qara Yusuf, ruler of the Black Sheep Turkomans.

In 1406, Qara Yusuf defeated the Timurids at the Battle of Nakhchivan and captured Tabriz. Miran Shah and Abu Bakr attempted to retake the city in the Battle of Sardrud on the 20 April 1408, but were decisively defeated by the joint efforts of the Turkomans and Jalayirids. As a result of this rout, all of Timur's western conquests were lost, with the Timurids being subsequently driven out of western Persia.

Though Abu Bakr had managed to escape, Miran Shah was struck down during the battle by a Turkoman chief who, having not recognised the prince, had stripped and looted his body. Qara Yusuf then had his head impaled before the walls of Tabriz to induce the cities inhabitants to surrender. Shortly thereafter, the Turkoman ruler sent Miran Shah's head and body, along with his own condolences, to Shah Rukh, who had emerged the victor in the war of succession. Miran Shah was buried alongside his father in the Gur-e-Amir in Samarqand.

Family
Miran Shah married three times:
Daulatgaldi Agha — daughter of Payanda Sultan, son of Jahangir Barlas
 Sayyidi Ahmad Miranshahi
 Sevin Beg Agha, also known as Khanzada — daughter of Aq Sufi Husayn Qunqirat and Shukur Beg Agha (daughter of Jani Beg, Khan of the Golden Horde); widow of his brother Jahangir Mirza
 Khalil Sultan (1384–1411)
Muhammad Qasim
Biki Sultan, married Iskandar, son of Umar Shaikh I and later his brother Bayqara I
 Urun Sultan Khanika — daughter of Suyurghatgmish Khan, Khan of the Chagatai Khanate
 Abu Bakr ibn Miran Shah (1382–1409)
Umar (1383–1407)
Qutlugh Sultan Begum married Sultan Husayn Tayichiud and later a Sayyid of Tirmiz

Concubines:
Murad Agha
Jamshid
Ruhparwar Agha
Qarachar
Nigar Agha
Fakhira Agha
Bakht Sultan Agha
Daulat Bakht Fuladbuqakhani
Muhammad Timur
Mihr Nush Fuladbuqakhani
Muhammad Mirza
Issues by unnamed mothers:
Ichil (1394–1415)
Suyurghatmish (b.1399)
Fatima Sultan Begum
Sa'adat Sultan Begum
Rajab Sutlan Begum, married to Sa'd Waqas (son of Muhammad Sultan, son of Jahangir Mirza) and then to Sanjar (son of Pir Muhammad, another son of Jahangir Mirza)
Rabia Sultan Begum

References

Timurid dynasty
1366 births
1408 deaths